"Believe Me, if All Those Endearing Young Charms" is a popular song written by the Irish poet Thomas Moore, setting new lyrics to a traditional Irish air that can be traced back into the 18th century. He published it in 1808, naming the air as "My Lodging is on the Cold Ground" from lyrics of British origin with which it was widely associated at the time. The new lyrics were presented in an album of selected Irish melodies arranged by John Andrew Stevenson with “characteristic words” provided by Moore.

Origin of the melody
The preface to their joint production quotes a letter that Moore wrote to Stevenson about the need for it to set the record straight on the Irish origin of many melodies that had come to be associated with “our English neighbours.” Toward that end, Moore devised lyrics to replace British ones such as "My Lodging is on the Cold Ground". The original version is attested in the play The Rivals by William Davenant, initially performed in 1662. It is sung by the character Celania in Act 5 to a melody that is not indicated.

William Grattan Flood provides details about a composed setting of "My Lodging is on the Cold Ground", published by Matthew Locke in 1665. It has no Irish nexus and is melodically altogether different from the one in the Stevenson/Moore compilation. The Rivals remained in the active theatre repertoire until at least 1668 and Locke’s melody is an obvious candidate for having been the one sung during its performance. Flood cautions against confusing it with the traditional melody used by Moore, which he claims (without substantiation) had been known under various names to Irish harpers from about 1745. However, he extensively cites verifiable sources with the British lyrics set to it, beginning in 1773.

The main focus of the Grattan Flood article is tracing the origins of yet another song set to the same melody in 1838 by Rev. Samuel Gilman in celebration of the 200th anniversary of the founding of Harvard University. It was titled "Fair Harvard" and adopted there for general festive use. The relatively brief interval between the publication of the two sets of lyrics can be seen as an indication of the popular attention that Moore had called to the shared melody.

Lyrics
Moore's lyrics express a reassurance that love endures through time and misfortune. It has, therefore, anecdotally been suggested that the underlying sentiments were directed toward his wife, who is said to have been stricken with smallpox.

From Stevenson and Moore, A Selection of Irish Melodies, 1808:

Other uses of the melody

"Endearing Young Charms" became a staple of Warner Bros. cartoons, appearing first in the 1944 Private Snafu short .  Subsequent uses included the 1951 Merrie Melodies animated cartoon Ballot Box Bunny, 1957 Looney Tunes short Show Biz Bugs, 1965 and 1994 Road Runner cartoons Rushing Roulette and Chariots of Fur respectively, and finally in a new twist on the gag, with Slappy Squirrel's 1993 introductory episode, "Slappy Goes Walnuts", from Animaniacs. In its cartoon appearances, the song is often the cue for a classic "bomb gag" where the playing of the first line of the song sets off a rigged explosion on the final note. However, the target often misses, forcing the perpetrator to play it himself and fall for his own trap.  The gag is so well known that it is often called "The Xylophone Gag".

Simone Mantia, a pioneer of American euphonium music, composed a theme and variations on the melody, which remains a staple of the solo euphonium literature.

Little Virgie (Shirley Temple) sings the song to her father (John Boles) in the 1935 film The Littlest Rebel. It is used in the film The Informer by John Ford. The first verse was sung by the character Alfalfa in a 1936 episode of MGM's The Little Rascals titled Bored of Education. Walter Huston plays the melody on the harmonica in the film The Treasure of the Sierra Madre. Debbie Reynolds and Barbara Ruick sing the first stanza in the 1953 film The Affairs of Dobie Gillis.

Roger Quilter's setting of the song was included in the Arnold Book of Old Songs, published in 1950.

Joni James includes the song on her album Joni Sings Irish Favorites (1959) and Bing Crosby included it in a medley on his album 101 Gang Songs (1961).

Variations were done in the 1963 Andy Griffith Show episode "Rafe Hollister Sings", and the 2010 South Park episode "Crippled Summer". An instrumental version of the song plays around the midpoint of the 1963 Twilight Zone episode "Passage on the Lady Anne". The song is performed at a Christmas party of the Adams Family at the beginning of "Chapter VIII: John Quincy Adams, Secretary of State" of The Adams Chronicles (1976). Meredith Baxter performs a stanza of the song during a fundraiser for Steven's public television station and goes into labor as she sings the high F in the episode "Birth of a Keaton, Part 1" of Family Ties (1984).

The first line appears in some versions of Dexys Midnight Runners' "Come On Eileen" as an introduction played by a solo fiddle.  A short version of the tune also appears at the end of some versions of the song.

References

External links
Choral Public Domain Library
Piano version

Irish folk songs
Poetry by Thomas Moore
Looney Tunes songs
Shirley Temple songs
1808 poems